Melinda Szikora (born 19 November 1988) is a Hungarian handball goalkeeper playing for SG BBM Bietigheim.

Achievements
Hungarian Championship:
Gold Medallist: 2015
Hungarian Cup:
Gold Medallist: 2017
Silver Medallist: 2014, 2015, 2019
Bronze Medallist: 2011, 2016, 2018
EHF European League:
Winner: 2022
Bundesliga:
Winner: 2022

References

External links

Melinda Szikora career statistics at Worldhandball

1988 births
Living people
People from Kiskunfélegyháza
Hungarian female handball players
Fehérvár KC players
Siófok KC players
Ferencvárosi TC players (women's handball)
Handball players at the 2020 Summer Olympics
Sportspeople from Bács-Kiskun County